The cuneiform sign ik, (and iq), is a common-use sign of the Amarna letters, the Epic of Gilgamesh, and other cuneiform texts (for example Hittite texts). It has a common secondary use in the Amarna letters for "iq", for the spelling of Akkadian "qabû", for English "to speak", in dialogue to the pharaoh in the letters.

Linguistically, it has the alphabetical usage in texts for k, or q, or g. And a replacement for any of the four vowels, a, e, i, u.

Epic of Gilgamesh usage
The ik sign usage in the Epic of Gilgamesh is as follows: (eg, 2 times, ek, 13, eq, 2, ig, 9, ik, 51, iq, 27, and IG, 8 times).

Gallery

References

 Parpola, 1971. The Standard Babylonian Epic of Gilgamesh, Parpola, Simo, Neo-Assyrian Text Corpus Project, c 1997, Tablet I thru Tablet XII, Index of Names, Sign List,

Cuneiform signs